The ZEC Kipawa is a "zone d'exploitation contrôlée" (controlled harvesting zone) (ZEC), located in the unorganized territory Les Lacs-du-Témiscamingue, in the Témiscamingue Regional County Municipality, in the administrative region of Abitibi-Témiscamingue, in Quebec, in Canada. Annually, the outdoor activities on the ZEC are intense from May to October, with camping, mountain biking, hunting, fishing and walking in the forest trails. The mission of the ZEC includes the protection of flora and fauna.

Geography 

Located in the heart of the Témiscamingue Regional County Municipality, ZEC Kipawa turns out to be the largest  zone d'exploitation contrôlée (Controlled harvesting zone) (ZEC) of Quebec with an area of 2397 square kilometres. This "Controlled harvesting area" has 750 lakes, many of which are exploited for recreational fishing.

ZEC Kipawa is connected on its east side to the La Vérendrye Wildlife Reserve; and on its south side related to the ZEC Restigo. The main mountains of Zec Kipawa are located in the vicinity of Lake Kikwissi: Mont Wakwik (331 m), Mount du Trappeur (360 m) and Rene Mountain (405 m). Major lakes of Zec including: Ostaboningue, Kikwissi, Saseginaga, McLachlin, Ogascaname, Lac des loups (The Wolf Lake), "Lac des foins" (Hay lake), Algonquin and Lescot. The main rivers flowing in the ZEC are: Kipawa, "Du pin Blanc" (white pine), "aux Écorces" (the bark), Brazeau stream and Seirs creek.

The main access roads to the zec include several secondary roads and trails for mountain biking. However, the ZEC has still vast wilderness areas that deserve to be discovered by visitors because of their exceptional panoramas.

The entrance station of the ZEC Kipawa open from Victoria Day (in May) and close around the end of the hunt of the moose with rifle (in October). Users can access the ZEC Kipawa through Val-d'Or (road Baie Carrière), through Temiscaming (819 Road), through Belleterre and Béarn (road 814). The main reception station that was installed in 2014, is located just outside the town of Béarn where the administrative offices of the ZEC are.

Toponymy 

The name of Zec joins that of the municipality, the post office, the bay, the dam, railway, roads, channel, lake, river and forest with the same name.

The designation "Kipawa" identified a priori the territory of the watershed of Lake Kipawa, in Témiscamingue Regional County Municipality. Then several other names in the sector are derived from the original name. A post office opened in 1878 and a train station reported in 1916 by James White under the English names "Kipawa Station" and "Kipawa Junction".

Since 1985, the term also means a municipality Kipawa near Temiscaming, at north-east of which it is located. Locality inhabited first by Algonquin and established on the banks of the Lake Kipawa, near Gordon Creek, facing English Bay, the term "Kipawa" means in Algonquin language, "it is closed". According to the Oblate missionary Joseph-Étienne Guinard, the Lake Kipawa "because of its long bays, looks like a spider from the air. It is easy to err on the waters, we take the bays rivers, we are committed and disappointment ahead. It's closed! Kipaw!" This privileged territory adjacent to a reserve, which recently became a controlled harvesting zone (ZEC) of over 4,600 square kilometers, is located at very short distance from the Indian Reserve Kebaowek.

The people of this town have both a gentile in French, Kipawais and Algonquin, Kipawawini, people closed lake.

The territory of the ZEC was once traveled by the Algonquin of Témiscamingue. Thus, several names of lakes are evocative of their presence: Ostaboningue, Saseginaga, Ogascanane, Kikwissi, Wolves...

The name "Zec Kipawa" was formalized on Sept. 6, 1989 at the Bank of place names in the Commission de toponymie du Québec (Geographical Names Board of Quebec.

Hunting and Fishing 

The wild animals are abundant in this vast territory. Species quota for hunting are the moose, the black bear, the grouse and hare. Hunting restrictions apply such as species, hunting period, type of hunting weapon, sex of beast (moose)...

The main species of fish living in lakes and rivers, are: pike, doré, brook trout and lake trout. ZEC has nine lakes available for ice fishing in the winter: "lac du club" (Lake Club), Lake Diamond, lac des îles (Lake of Islands), Lake Line, McNorton Lake, Little Moose Lake, Lake Sheen and Lake Wabacouche. Besides fishing and hunting, outdoor enthusiasts can practice several activities including travel five circuits canoe-camping for beginners level adventurers. ZEC offers users several campgrounds and rustic semi-furnished (wild).

The territory of the ZEC is served by seven providers with services (accommodation, boats, motors). You can practice different activities such as canoe camping there, rent canoes and kayaks. The footpath Kipawa-TeeLake spans two kilometres; the starting point is the entrance station of the Zec Kipawa station at kilometre 35 in the road of penetration (forest road) starting from Béarn.

Circuits of canoe camping 

The main circuits canoe camping offered by ZEC Kipawa are:

Circuit Des Raiders:

This loop path of 190 km and 11 portages combines the calm waters of the historic route Tuk Tuk TUK and the living waters of the Kipawa River. From Algonquin's history of Hunter's Point to the tombs of the souls of loggers who lost their lives in the rapids of the Kipawa River. Access to the course is by Béarn. The route provides access to a section of the Kipawa River. The circuit may be segmented at Hunter starting point. Browse the route takes 12 to 14 days.

Circuit Cigarette:

This loop course was named in the shape of a lake along the way. This route offers a wide variety of lakes, swamps, springs and beaches to explore. The Ogascanane lake offers countless opportunities to swim and enjoy the white sandy beaches of exotic allure. The journey along the "Cigarette route" takes in several attractions within a short distance. This 31 km route has four ports. The tour route is on 3–4 days. Aboriginal variant of the name is Micikikanick Sakalkan. The circuit includes the Lacs des Loups, Ogascanane, Jumeaux (Twin), the Cigarette and Long.

Circuit Tuk Tuk:

The majority of the history of the Kipawa area is concentrated along this loop circuit a length of 96 km. This trip offers many sites of cultural heritage, but the diverse landscapes and the many marshes provide excellent opportunities to observe wildlife, because most of the trail is in an isolated environment. It takes 4 to 10 days to do the turn of this circuit. It contains twelve portages. Aboriginal variant: Sagegawega. Name of reference lake: Saseginaga. Composition of the trail: Ostaboningue lake, Ostaboningue river, Hunter's Point Lake, Audoin River, lac du Bouleau (Birch Lake), Lake Pommeroy, Lake Eau Claire, lakes Saseginaga, Écarté, North, BL and "rivière Cerise" (Cherry River). Access is through Béarn. It contains campsites in sufficient numbers.

Circuit Brousse:

Length - 58 km (in loop). It includes a dozen of challenging portages, including one over a beaver dam in order to connect the lakes and the rivers farther away. From Fjord around "lac des Six îles" (Lake Six islands) up to the winding banks of the Cherry River, the scenery alone lends itself to a memorable experience. The duration of the tour: 4–5 days. Aboriginal variant: Kanikotwasotipalkanek Sakalkan. Name of reference lake: Six Miles. Composition of the trail: Lake Ostaboningue, Cooks Bay, lakes Cooks, Robert, Six Miles, Six Islands, Sasseginage and return by the Cherry River. There are rapid and falls. Access to the course is by Béarn. There are an opportunity to go up the Cherry river and to do the same circuit in the opposite direction of the proposal. It must be between 4 and 5 days for the ride.

Circuit Scale:

The 98 km circuit with eight ports curly transposes us in time of colonization and deforestation with the old railway along the portage to Lake Pommeroy. The route follows a portion of the historic route of the Tuk Tuk then head to the most remote lakes of Témiscamingue hinterland. There are beautiful waterfalls between lakes the Pants and "l'Échelle" (Scale) lakes. The total time is 7 to 8 days.

See also

Related articles 

 Les Lacs-du-Témiscamingue, unorganized territory
 Témiscamingue Regional County Municipality (RCM)
 Abitibi-Témiscamingue, administrative region of Quebec
 Zone d'exploitation contrôlée (Controlled Harvesting Zone) (ZEC)

References 

Protected areas of Abitibi-Témiscamingue
Protected areas established in 1989